Dokumentado (lit. Documented) is a tabloid news comedy television show that premiered on April 7, 2010 on TV5.

Background
The TV show is about different personalities caught on act by reporters of News5. The format was somewhat similar to TMZ, except that it focuses more on politics rather than showbiz. It was first hosted by News5 head Luchi Cruz-Valdes. The reporters tell stories of different personalities in politics and showbiz.

On September 8, 2010, Martin Andanar replaced Cruz-Valdes when the latter was assigned to host Journo. The show concluded its run on August 31, 2011.

On November 30, 2011, the show returned on AksyonTV as part of AksyonTV Originals with News5 Production head, Patrick Paez replacing Andanar.

On-air staff

Final host
 Patrick Paez (2011–2013)

Previous
 Martin Andanar (2010–2011)
 Luchi Cruz-Valdes (2010)

Segment Hosts/Reporters

News5 Reporters (frequent)
 Trish Roque
 Maeanne Los Baños
 MJ Marfori

Segment Producers
 Alvher Jade Depotado
 Fredierick Vocal
 Chris Osia
 Jovy Barangay

AksyonTV original programming
2010 Philippine television series debuts
TV5 (Philippine TV network) news shows
Filipino-language television shows